The women's 300 metre freestyle was a swimming event held as part of the swimming at the 1920 Summer Olympics programme. It was the first appearance of the event, which was later adjusted to 400 metres to match the men's competition.

A total of 16 swimmers from seven nations competed in the event, which was held on Thursday, August 26 and on Saturday, August 28, 1920.

Records

These were the standing world and Olympic records (in minutes) prior to the 1920 Summer Olympics.

In the first semi-final Ethelda Bleibtrey set a new world record with 4:41.4 minutes. She bettered her own record in the final with 4:34.0 minutes.

Results

Semifinals

Thursday, August 26, 1920: The fastest two in each semi-final and the fastest third-placed from across the semi-finals advanced.

Semifinal 1

Semifinal 2

Semifinal 3

Final

Saturday, August 28, 1920:

References

External links
 
 

Swimming at the 1920 Summer Olympics
1920 in women's swimming
Swim